WXVT-LD (channel 17) is a low-power television station licensed to Cleveland, Mississippi, United States, serving as the CBS affiliate for the Delta area. It is owned by Imagicomm Communications alongside Greenwood-licensed dual ABC/Fox affiliate WABG-TV (channel 6) and Grenada-licensed low-powered NBC affiliate WNBD-LD (channel 33). The three stations share studios on Washington Avenue in Greenville; WXVT-LD's transmitter is located near O'Reilly, Mississippi.

History

Its first broadcast was on November 7, 1980, on channel 15 under the call sign WXVT. It was a CBS affiliate for its entire existence. Before this, WJTV in Jackson had served as the default affiliate. The station was originally owned by Big River Broadcasting. Future sister station WABG was actually the Delta's original CBS affiliate when it launched back in October 1959 until dropping CBS to become a full-time ABC affiliate in November 1966. Big River Broadcasting sold the station to Lamco Communications in 1984. Lamco then sold WXVT to a local ownership group in 1991. Saga Communications purchased WXVT in 1999. David Cavileer became the VP/General Manager and remodeled the station and news set.

The current WXVT-LD began as W17DI-D on February 25, 2010. On December 12, 2011, it was changed to WFXW-LD.

On May 4, 2012, an application was filed with the Federal Communications Commission (FCC) to transfer ownership of WXVT from Saga Communications to H3 Communications. H3 Communications is owned by the adult children of Charles Harker, president of Commonwealth Broadcasting Group, which owns WABG and WNBD. On January 28, 2013, the FCC granted the sale of WXVT, and it was completed two days later. Commonwealth then took over WXVT's operations, effectively bringing all of the Delta's Big Three network stations under the control of one company.

In 2015, WXVT and WABG appeared in a TruTV reality series Breaking Greenville. It premiered January 29, 2015 and ended on March 26, 2015.

H3 Communications agreed to sell WXVT to Cala Broadcast Partners for $3.7 million on October 30, 2015; concurrently, Cala would purchase WABG-TV, WNBD-LD, and WFXW-LD from Commonwealth Broadcasting Group. Cala is jointly owned by Brian Brady (who owns several other television stations, mostly under the Northwest Broadcasting name) and Jason Wolff (who owns radio and television stations through Frontier Radio Management). On November 30, 2015, Cala assigned its right to purchase WXVT to John Wagner for $100,000. The sale was completed on August 1, 2016; on that date, the station went off the air, with Wagner stating in a filing with the FCC that it was looking for new programming. This resulted in the WXVT intellectual unit, including CBS programming, being moved to a digital subchannel of sister station and NBC affiliate WNBD-LD and mapped to WXVT's former channel 15.

On January 1, 2017, Cable One (now Sparklight) removed channels owned by Northwest Broadcasting (WXVT, WABG-TV, WABG-DT2 and WNBD-LD) after the two companies failed to reach an agreement. On February 1, 2017, the channels were restored to Cable One's lineup under a new carriage deal.

On June 26, 2017, the station became low-powered, re-licensed to Cleveland, and moved to RF channel 17. It changed its call sign to WXVT-LD on July 7. In 2020, channel 15 would be sold to Tri-State Christian Television, where it continues to operate as WFXW.

In February 2019, Reuters reported that Apollo Global Management had agreed to acquire the entirety of Brian Brady's television portfolio, which it intends to merge with Cox Media Group (which Apollo is acquiring at the same time) and stations spun off from Nexstar Media Group's purchase of Tribune Broadcasting, once the purchases are approved by the FCC. In March 2019 filings with the FCC, Apollo confirmed that its newly-formed broadcasting group, Terrier Media, would acquire Northwest Broadcasting, with Brian Brady holding an unspecified minority interest in Terrier. In June 2019, it was announced that Terrier Media would instead operate as Cox Media Group, as Apollo had reached a deal to also acquire Cox's radio and advertising businesses. The transaction was completed on December 17.

On March 29, 2022, Cox Media Group announced it would sell WXVT-LD, WNBD-LD, WABG-TV and 15 other stations to Imagicomm Communications, an affiliate of the parent company of the INSP cable channel, for $488 million; the sale was completed on August 1.

Programming

Syndicated programming
Syndicated programming on WXVT-LD includes Jeopardy!, Inside Edition, Judge Mathis, Judge Judy, and Wheel of Fortune, among others.

Newscasts
As of August 2016, all four networks including WABG-TV (ABC & Fox), WXVT-LD (CBS), and WNBD-LD (NBC) have consolidated under one branding, The Delta News. The Delta News studios and offices are located on Washington Avenue in Greenville. The new ownership includes news on all four networks.

Subchannel

References

 
 
 CDBS Public Access, Federal Communications Commission, 1 August 2016, Retrieved 10 August 2016.

External links
Official website

XVT-LD
CBS network affiliates
Low-power television stations in the United States
Television channels and stations established in 2017
2017 establishments in Mississippi
Imagicomm Communications